Petr Cajka (born 11 December 2000) is a Czech professional ice hockey centre who is currently playing with the  SC Rapperswil-Jona Lakers of the National League (NL).

Cajka played most his junior hockey in Switzerland which allows him to compete in the National League and in the Swiss League with a Swiss player-license.

Playing career
Cajka made his professional debut during the 2017-18 season appearing in 2 games with the EVZ Academy of the Swiss League (SL).

Cajka played one season of junior hockey with the Erie Otters of the Ontario Hockey League (OHL) during the 2018/19 season and scored 38 points (20 goals) in 63 regular season games.

On August 2, 2019, Cajka signed his first professional contract with Genève-Servette HC, agreeing to a three-year deal extending from the 2020/21 season through the 2022/23 season. Cajka played the entire 2019/20 season as a junior on Genève-Servette HC U20 team in order to obtain his Swiss-player license for the 2020/21 season. He played 33 regular season games with the U20 team this season, putting up 42 points (17 goals). Cajka made his National League debut on September 24, 2020 against Lausanne HC. He was inserted in the lineup as the team's 4th import player as Henrik Tömmernes was out at the time with an injury. On February 28, 2020, Cajka scored his first NL goal against Lausanne HC at home in an empty Patinoire des Vernets due to the Coronavirus pandemic. He was limited to 5 NL regular season games (2 points) this season.

On September 14, 2020, Cajka was traded, along with Tim Bozon, to Lausanne HC in exchange for Joel Vermin. He was immediately loaned to the HCB Ticino Rockets of the Swiss League (SL) to begin the 2020/21 season. Cajka played 34 games with the Rockets scoring 24 points (10 goals) before being recalled by Lausanne on February 13, 2021. He played 2 games with the team in the NL before being shipped to HC Ambrì-Piotta on February 16, 2021, agreeing to a 2-year deal with the Biancoblu. The deal runs through to the end of the 2021/22 season with an option for the 2022/23 season.

International play
Cajka was named to the Czech Republic men's U20 national team for the 2020 World Junior Championships in the Czech Republic. He scored one goal in 5 games played as the Czechs fell to Sweden in the 1/4 finals.

References

External links

2000 births
Living people
Genève-Servette HC players
Erie Otters players
Czech ice hockey centres
People from Kadaň
Sportspeople from the Ústí nad Labem Region
Czech expatriate ice hockey players in the United States
Czech expatriate ice hockey players in Switzerland
Naturalised citizens of Switzerland
SC Rapperswil-Jona Lakers players
Lausanne HC players
HC Ambrì-Piotta players
HCB Ticino Rockets players